Klutch Academy (also known as KLUTCH Academy) is an American five-part television documentary series which premiered on November 23, 2021 on BET.

Cast
Brandon Boston Jr.
Kai Jones
Jalen Johnson
Moses Moody
Jericho Sims
Scottie Lewis
Terrence Clarke

Episodes

References

External links

2020s American documentary television series
2020s American television miniseries
2021 American television series debuts
2021 American television series endings
BET original programming
English-language television shows
Historical television series